Norris J. Lacy (born March 8, 1940 in Hopkinsville, Kentucky) is an American scholar focusing on French medieval literature. He was the Edwin Erle Sparks Professor Emeritus of French and Medieval Studies at the Pennsylvania State University until his retirement in 2012, a position he had held since 1998.  He is a leading expert on the Arthurian legend and has written and edited numerous books, papers, and articles on the topic. In 2014 the International Arthurian Society, North American Branch, presented him an award for Lifetime Service to Arthurian Studies.

He received his Ph.D. from Indiana University and has held teaching positions at the University of Kansas, the University of California, Los Angeles, and Washington University in St. Louis. He has served as president of the International Arthurian Society. With Geoffrey Ashe he wrote The Arthurian Handbook, and he edited The Arthurian Encyclopedia and its successor, The New Arthurian Encyclopedia, a standard reference book for Arthurian works. He also oversaw the first complete English translation of the French Vulgate and Post-Vulgate Cycles, released as the five (alternatively ten) volume Lancelot-Grail: The Old French Arthurian Vulgate and Post-Vulgate in Translation.

He was knighted in France's Ordre des Palmes Académiques, first as a Chevalier in 1988, and subsequently elevated to the rank of Officier in 2003.

References

The first full English translations of the Vulgate and Post-Vulgate Cycles were overseen by Norris J. Lacy. Volumes 1–4 contain the Vulgate Cycle proper.
Lacy, Norris J. (Ed.). Lancelot–Grail: The Old French Arthurian Vulgate and Post-Vulgate in Translation, New York: Garland.
Volume 1 of 5 (December 1, 1992). .
Volume 2 of 5 (August 1, 1993). .
Volume 3 of 5 (March 1, 1995). .
Volume 4 of 5 (April 1, 1995). .
Volume 5 of 5 (May 1, 1996). .
Lacy, Norris J. (Ed.) (2000). The Lancelot–Grail Reader. New York: Garland. .

External links
Norris J. Lacy personal webpage

American medievalists
Arthurian scholars
Indiana University alumni
1940 births
Living people
Pennsylvania State University faculty
Washington University in St. Louis faculty
Holy Grail
Officiers of the Ordre des Palmes Académiques